De Libertad y Amor (Of Freedom and Love) was a music album released by the Chilean folk group Illapu in exile in France in 1984.

Track listing
”De libertad y amor”/Of Freedom and Love/ (D. Torres - Roberto Márquez) - 3:27
”Población La Victoria”/Town "La Victoria" [Instrumental] (R.Márquez) - 4:17
”Puerto Rico, Puerto Pobre”/Rich Port, Poor Port (Pablo Neruda - José M. Márquez) -  4:47
”Pampa Lirima” (Roberto Márquez) - 4:19
”Golpe Tocuyano” (Tino Carrasco) - 3:47
”Canción de Octubre”/Song for October - [Instrumental] (Roberto Márquez) - 3:15
”Copla de Morenada” (Roberto Márquez) - 3:15
”No Pronuncies Mi Nombre”/Don't Pronounce My Name (Roque Dalton - Roberto Márquez) – 5:06
”María Paleta” (Venezuelan Trad.) - 3:17
”Un Dia Borrare Esta Página”/One Day I Will Erase this Page (Quilo Martinez - Roberto Márquez) - 3:47 www.quilomartinez.com

Personnel

 Roberto Márquez B.
 Eric Maluenda G.
 Andrés Márquez B.
 José M. Márquez B.
 Juan C. Márquez B.
 Jaime Márquez B.

External links
Of Freedom and Love: One of the Greatest Albums Ever – Review by Tony Maygarden

1984 albums